Ceratophyllus maculatus is a species of flea in the family Ceratophyllidae. It was described by Wagner in 1927.

References 

Ceratophyllidae
Insects described in 1927